Croteau Lake is a lake at the head of Browns River on the Forbidden Plateau on Vancouver Island.

See also
List of lakes of British Columbia

References

Alberni Valley
Lakes of Vancouver Island
Comox Land District